The Symphony No. 3, Op. 20, is a three-movement orchestral composition written from 1943 to 1944 by the Swedish composer Dag Wirén. Despite its numbering, the Third Symphony represents Wirén's second contribution to the form as a professional (the composer withdrew the Symphony No. 1, Op. 3—a 1932 experimental "study work" from his student years in Paris—and prohibited its performance), arriving five years after its predecessor, the Symphony No. 2. Swedish conductor Sixten Eckerberg premiered the new symphony with the Gothenburg Symphony Orchestra in Gothenburg on 28 September 1944.

Structure 

The Third Symphony is in three movements. They are as follows:

Orchestration 
Woodwind: 2 flutes, 2 oboes, 2 clarinets, 2 bassoons
Brass: 4 horns, 2 trumpets, 3 trombones, tuba
Percussion: timpani
Strings: violins, violas, cellos, double basses

Recordings 

The Dausgaard recording has received generally positive reviews. ClassicsToday.com's David Hurwitz, for example, describes the Third as "portraying the eventual triumph of its song-like, rhapsodic elements over its more active, aggressive ones". Furthermore, he detects in the Third Symphony (and its disc partner, the Symphony No. 2) echoes of Jean Sibelius and Carl Nielsen, concluding: "Not a bad combination! In fact, Wirén's symphonic achievement rubs shoulders easily with the 20th century's finest works in the form". Fanfare's Paul Snook describes the Third as representative of "this patient, self-critical composer's evolution toward a singular and personalized type of Neo-Classical minimalism, where every detail counts"; he further labels the disc "a welcome and necessary addition to the Swedish recorded repertoire" that "points to the mature Wirén". The American Record Guide's Mark Lehman praises the "splendid" Symphonies Nos. 2 and 3 as "overflow[ing] with an untroubled but mysterious joy", noting in particular their "pantheistic expansiveness and dewy-fresh orchestral transparency".

References and sources

References

Sources 

CD liner notes

Websites

Music criticism
 
 
 

Symphonies by Dag Wirén
20th-century classical music
Classical music in Sweden
1944 compositions